Zbigniew Szajewski (10 June 1914 – 13 April 1997) was a Polish wrestler. He competed at the 1936 Summer Olympics and the 1952 Summer Olympics.

References

1914 births
1997 deaths
Polish male sport wrestlers
Olympic wrestlers of Poland
Wrestlers at the 1936 Summer Olympics
Wrestlers at the 1952 Summer Olympics
Sportspeople from Warsaw
People from Warsaw Governorate